Olivia Amoako  (born 30 September 1985) is a Ghanaian footballer who played as a defender for the Ghana women's national football team. She was part of the team at the 2007 FIFA Women's World Cup. On club level, she played for Ghatel Ladies in Ghana.

See also
List of Ghana women's international footballers

References

External links
 

1985 births
Living people
Ghanaian women's footballers
Ghana women's international footballers
Place of birth missing (living people)
2007 FIFA Women's World Cup players
Women's association football defenders